Rosy Afsary (also Rosy Samad, 23 April 1946 – 9 March 2007) was an actress in the Bangladeshi film industry. She was awarded the Bangladesh National Film Award for Best Supporting Actress in its first ceremony in 1975 for her role in the film Lathial.

Career
Afsary started her career in 1964 through Eito Jibon film. She appeared in over 200 Bengali films and always played a positive sad role. She also acted in 25 Urdu films. She was President of Zia Sangskritik Parishad (Zisus).

Personal life
Afsary was first married to filmmaker Abdus Samad. Then in 1981, she married filmmaker Malek Afsary and changed her surname to Rosy Afsary. Her sister Parveen Ahmed Ruhi was wife of veteran Actor Washim.

Filmography

Awards
 National Film Award - 1975 for Best Supporting Actress
 Bachsas Awards
 Zahir Raihan Padak
 Nigar Awards vd

Death and legacy
Afsari died on 9 March 2007 at Birdem Hospital, Dhaka of kidney failure. A Google Doodle on 23 April 2019 commemorated Afsari's 73rd birth anniversary.

References

External links
 
 Rosy Afsari at the Bangla Movie Database

1946 births
2007 deaths
20th-century Bangladeshi actresses
Deaths from kidney failure
Bangladeshi film actresses
Best Supporting Actress National Film Award (Bangladesh) winners
People from Lakshmipur District
Best Supporting Actress Bachsas Award winners